"Glasgow Mega-Snake" is a song by Scottish post-rock band Mogwai from their fifth album, Mr Beast.

Overview
"Glasgow Mega-Snake" is a live favourite. It originally had the working title of "Glower of a Cat".  Stuart Braithwaite has commented on the song, saying

In popular culture

 The song is featured in the Tony Hawk video game, Tony Hawk's Project 8.

 The song is featured in the announce trailer for the Dead Space 2 multiplayer.

 The song featured in the 2012 video game Spec Ops: The Line.

External links
"Glasgow Mega-Snake" Guitar Tablature
"Glasgow Mega-Snake" on Last.fm

Notes

Mogwai songs
2006 songs
Instrumentals
Songs written by Barry Burns